This is a list of people who have served as Lord Lieutenant of Cornwall. Since 1742, all the Lords Lieutenant have also been Custos Rotulorum of Cornwall.

John Russell, 1st Earl of Bedford 1552–1554
John Bourchier, 2nd Earl of Bath 1556–?
Francis Russell, 2nd Earl of Bedford 1584 – 28 July 1585
jointly held: 8 August 1586 – 7 December 1587
Sir Francis Godolphin
Sir William Mohun
Peter Edgcumbe
Richard Carew
Sir Walter Raleigh 7 December 1587 – 24 March 1603
William Herbert, 3rd Earl of Pembroke 21 May 1604 – 10 April 1630
Philip Herbert, 4th Earl of Pembroke 17 August 1630 – 1642
John Robartes, 1st Earl of Radnor 1642 (Parliamentarian)
Interregnum
John Granville, 1st Earl of Bath 1 October 1660 – April 1696 jointly with
Charles Granville, 2nd Baron Granville 6 May 1691 – March 1693
Charles Robartes, 2nd Earl of Radnor 24 April 1696 – 1702
John Granville, 1st Baron Granville 18 June 1702 – 1705
Sidney Godolphin, 1st Earl of Godolphin 16 April 1705 – 1710
Laurence Hyde, 1st Earl of Rochester 15 April 1710 – 2 May 1711
Henry Hyde, 2nd Earl of Rochester 25 October 1711 – September 1714
Charles Robartes, 2nd Earl of Radnor 13 November 1714 – 3 August 1723
vacant
Richard Edgcumbe, 1st Baron Edgcumbe 29 July 1742 – 22 November 1758
Richard Edgcumbe, 2nd Baron Edgcumbe 5 March 1759 – 10 May 1761
George Edgcumbe, 1st Earl of Mount Edgcumbe 22 June 1761 – 4 February 1795
Richard Edgcumbe, 2nd Earl of Mount Edgcumbe 17 April 1795 – 26 September 1839
Sir William Salusbury-Trelawny, 8th Baronet 30 December 1839 – 15 November 1856
Charles Vivian, 2nd Baron Vivian 17 December 1856 – 1877
William Edgcumbe, 4th Earl of Mount Edgcumbe 6 November 1877 – 25 September 1917
John Charles Williams 24 January 1918 – 1936
Sir Edward Hoblyn Warren Bolitho 17 February 1936 – 1962
Sir John Gawen Carew Pole, 12th Baronet 29 August 1962 – 1977
George Boscawen, 9th Viscount Falmouth 1977–1994
Lady Mary Holborow 10 November 1994 – 19 September 2011
Colonel Edward Bolitho 19 September 2011 – present

Deputy lieutenants
A deputy lieutenant of Cornwall is commissioned by the Lord Lieutenant of Cornwall. Deputy lieutenants support the work of the lord-lieutenant. There can be several deputy lieutenants at any time, depending on the population of the county. Their appointment does not terminate with the changing of the lord-lieutenant, but they usually retire at age 75.

18th Century
11 December 1792: John Thomas, Esq.
11 December 1792: John Lemon, Esq.
11 December 1792: David Howell, Esq.
11 December 1792: George Bickford, Esq.
11 December 1792: Walter Raleigh Gilbert, Esq.
11 December 1792: Edward Archer, Esq.
11 December 1792: John Penhallow Peters, Esq.
11 December 1792: William Clode, Esq.
15 February 1793: John Trevenen, Esq.
15 February 1793: Thomas Bennett, Esq.
15 February 1793: Arthur Kempe, Esq.

19th Century
29 March 1848: Edward Archer, Esq.

References

 

Politics of Cornwall
History of Cornwall
Cornwall
 
Cornwall-related biographical lists